SS Corinaldo was a British steamship that collided with and sank the French passenger ship  in 1936.

The collision left Eubee with her engine room flooded, and five stokers killed. Corinaldo took off Eubee′s passengers. Eubee was taken in tow by the Brazilian tugboat  and the Uruguayan tugboat , but foundered on 16 August 1936. Eubee′s crew was rescued by Antonio Azambuja.

References

External links
 
 

Steamships of the United Kingdom
Maritime incidents in 1936